Hoy, Love You! is a Philippine romantic comedy streaming television series starring Joross Gamboa and Roxanne Guinoo. The series premiered on iWantTFC on January 18, 2021. The series has been renewed for a second season, which premiered on September 11, 2021. On June 3, 2022, the series has been renewed for a third season which premiered on September 30, 2022.

Premise
Single parents Jules and Marge are in pursuit of their personal dreams in life for themselves and their respective children. The two accidental meet each other but soon develops a close relationship when they are both assigned to work on a construction project together in the province.

Cast and characters
Main Cast:
 Joross Gamboa as Jules
 Roxanne Guinoo as Marge
 Aljon Mendoza as Charles 
 Karina Bautista as Kara
Supporting Casts:
 Dominic Ochoa as Richard 
 Carmi Martin as Madam Elizabeth
 Keanna Reeves as Aling Malu
 Yamyam Gucong as Bart
 Pepe Herrera as Tommy
 TJ Valderrama as Drew
 Brenna Garcia as Johanna Rose
 Ketchup Eusebio as Temyong (season 2–3)
 Ritz Azul as Mica  (season 2)
 Hasna Cabral as Kitty  (season 2)
 Lou Veloso as Lolo Bruno  (season 2–3)
 Kate Alejandrino as Agnes (season 3)
 Donna Cariaga as Doctor Kaye Wanda (season 3)
 Race Matias as Kulas (season 3)

Episodes

Season 1

Hoy Love You Two (Season 2)

Hoy Love You 3 (Season 3)

Production
Marvin Agustin and Jolina Magdangal were initially cast to lead the series. In November 2020, Agustin left the project at the last minute, prompting the production to find a replacement.

Release

Broadcast

The show's first season had its Philippine TV Premiere from July 31 to September 11, 2021, on Yes Weekend Saturday primetime on Kapamilya Channel, Kapamilya Online Live and A2Z replacing Bawal Lumabas: The Series and was replaced by Unloving U.

Hoy Love You 3 premiered on October 15 to November 13, 2022, on Yes Weekend Sunday primetime on Kapamilya Channel, Kapamilya Online Live and A2Z replacing Flower of Evil and was replaced by Dream Maker. It also aired international via TFC (The Filipino Channel).

References

External links
 
 Hoy, Love You! on iWantTFC

ABS-CBN drama series
IWantTFC original programming
Philippine romantic comedy television series
2021 Philippine television series debuts
2021 web series debuts
2021 web series endings
Filipino-language television shows
Television shows set in the Philippines